PFY may refer to:

 Pimply-Faced Youth, a character in the Bastard Operator From Hell series
 Poulton-le-Fylde railway station, England, station code
 Pel-Air airline, ICAO code